Curse of Bigfoot is a 1975 American horror television film produced and directed by Dave Flocker (credited as Don Fields), and written by James T. Flocker (credited as J.T. Fields).

Plot summary 
A high school biology class receives a visitor, who is a good friend of their teacher. He tells them of an encounter that he and their teacher had 15 years before while searching for Indian artifacts in the nearby mountains. They find a mummified corpse in a cave that resembles a rough-hewn statue. The mummy is brought back to their lodge and breaks out of its wrappings. It goes on a short rampage in what appears to be an orchard. The humans gather together to stop the creature before it can kill anyone.

Cast 
Bob Clymire as Johnny
Jan Swihart as Sharon
Bill Simonsen as Dr. Bill Wyman
Dennis Kottmeier
Ruth Ann Mannella as Linda
Ken Kloepfer as Norman
Mary Brownless

Production
Curse of Bigfoot is an expanded version of a 1958 film made by the same director and writer which was only released in their home town, and was later titled Teenagers Battle the Thing for a video release in the '90s. Two teenagers from the original appear as adults in the opening scene of the 1976 film. The rest of Curse of Bigfoot consists of the entire 1958 film seen as a flashback. The original film focused on the resurrection of a prehistoric monster and had nothing to do with Bigfoot.

DVD release 
The film was released on DVD on 8 July 2008.

On 16 April 2012, Curse of Bigfoot was released as a VOD title by RiffTrax.

References

External links 

1976 films
1976 horror films
Bigfoot films
American natural horror films
American horror television films
1970s English-language films
1970s American films